Sung-Yoon Lee is a scholar of Korean and East Asian studies, and specialist on North Korea. He is the Kim Koo-Korea Foundation Professor in Korean Studies and assistant professor at the Fletcher School of Law and Diplomacy, Tufts University. He was an associate in research at the Korea Institute, Harvard University. and a research fellow at the National Asia Research Program.

Lee has provided advice to the U.S. government and is an outspoken proponent of several policies aimed at changing the North Korean regime towards a path of denuclearization and improvement of human rights, while keeping the peace and stability in Northeast Asia. Lee has argued that this can be accomplished with a dual strategy of stern treatment of the North Korean government through unwavering economic sanctions aimed at weakening the leadership and security apparatus, while engaging the country's people through information campaigns that break their isolation from the outside world, humanitarian aid, and a global campaign of human rights.

He has also stated that the U.S. and its military presence in Northeast Asia have brought decades of stability and prosperity to the region, and supports its continued stationing in the Korean peninsula. He also encourages the eventual unification of Korea under the South's direction, with the active support of the U.S. and China, and a resulting united country that is amicable to both powers.

Education 

Lee majored in American and British literature at New College in Sarasota, Florida, graduating in 1991. He pursued his graduate studies at the Fletcher School, completing his Master of Arts in 1994, and his Ph.D. in 1998. John Curtis Perry became his doctoral advisor and developed a lifelong mentor-mentee relationship. In his dissertation "The antinomy of divine right and the right to resistance: tianming, dei gratia, and vox populi in Syngman Rhee's Korea, 1945–1960", Lee analyzed the interplay between Confucianism and democracy in defining political authority and statecraft during the early years of the Republic of Korea.

Career 

Lee first joined the faculty of The Fletcher School as the adjunct assistant professor of international politics in 1998 and until 2005. Concurrently he was also the visiting assistant professor of history at Tufts university starting in 2000 and until 2005. Between 2005 and 2006 he was the Kim Koo Research Associate at the Korea Institute, Harvard University. In 2007 he resumed his position at the Fletcher School, and in 2012 became the first holder of the newly created chair Kim Koo-Korea Foundation Assistant Professor of Korean Studies.

He teaches International Relations of the United States and East Asia 1945 to Present, United States and East Asia, Politics of the Korean Peninsula: Foreign and Inter-Korean Relations, and North Korean State and Society.

Lee has also been an adjunct assistant professor of Asian studies at Bowdoin College in 2000, and the visiting professor of Korean studies at Sogang University in 2007, and at Seoul National University from 2012 to 2016.

From 1999 until 2013 Lee was an associate in research at the Korea Institute, Harvard University. There he launched a new seminar series, the “Kim Koo Forum on U.S.-Korea Relations”, in 2005. He is a former research fellow with the National Asia Research Program, a joint initiative by the National Bureau of Asian Research and the Woodrow Wilson International Center for Scholars.

Lee has attended numerous conferences as a speaker, moderator and interpreter. He is also a frequent commentator on Korean affairs on radio, television and print. Lee has also testified in the United States Congress to provide expert advice on North Korea policy issues.

Since 2013 Lee has been playing an active role in discussions of U.S. North Korea sanctions legislation, participating in Congressional hearings, advising the U.S. House Foreign Affairs Committee and Senate Foreign Relations Committee, as well as making a strong case for it on major U.S. media outlets. These efforts contributed towards a bill, passed in 2016, of unprecedented tough sanctions primarily aimed at restricting cash flows into the country in an effort to undermine its nuclear warhead and long-range missile development, and constrict Pyongyang's ability to pay (and retain the loyalty of) its party elites, security forces, and military.

In 2018 Lee participated in the Warmbier v. DPRK trial in Washington D.C. as an expert witness for the prosecution. The judge ruled against the DPRK, in the torture, hostage taking, and extrajudicial killing of Otto Warmbier.

Policy views on North Korea 

Lee has advocated for a strategy of stern treatment of the North Korean government, while engaging the North Korean people. That includes economic pressure aimed at the elite, especially targeting its palace economy that depends on illicit activities including proliferation, smuggling, counterfeiting, and money laundering. It also means availing substantial humanitarian aid, provided it reaches the intended recipients, increasing efforts to disseminate more information from the outside world into North Korea, facilitating defections, and pressing for a global campaign of human rights.

Lee has underscored that the only non-military way to force North Korea into a real negotiation on denuclearization and human rights is to exert sustained economic and propaganda pressure to "destroy the Kim regime’s instruments of self-preservation": A nuclear program, a loyal ruling class, and a submissive society. That is, by on the one hand pushing more outside information into the North so its society can turn against the regime, and on the other hand by exerting sanctions that limit the cash used to prop the military and ruling apparatus, the regime would weaken to the point of near-collapse, forcing it to negotiate a transition, including a pragmatic way out for the Kim family.

Lee has frequently urged policymakers not to fall for the "self-defeating" trap of short-term concessionary diplomacy, and instead take the long view of an unwavering strategy of pressure. Lee sustains that refraining from making concessions in exchange for North Korea halting its cyclical belligerence is the most effective way to deter future provocations.

Achieving denuclearization and regime change

Financial and trade sanctions
Lee emphatically has asserted that "the only nonmilitary means of forestalling [North Korea's nuclear and missile developments] is for the U.S. to enforce both American and United Nations sanctions against the North Korean regime and its enablers, the foremost of which remains China."

Sanctions should be primarily imposed (as some have) by the U.N. Security Council, and therefore make them binding on the entire international community. However, these "so far did little damage to Pyongyang’s economy thanks to Beijing’s massive material support through the backdoor," further, Beijing has demonstrated "a disingenuous pattern of diplomatic ambidexterity. China has made token gestures like signing on to UN Security Council resolutions while failing to enforce them fully"

Sanctions are the means to reduce external inflows of cash that the regime needs to advance its nuclear and missile development, as well as to keep its ruling class and security apparatus loyal. These sanctions, if made strong and sustained in time, would lead to significantly weakening the regime to the point of near-collapse; by prompting "bankruptcy and the consequent destabilization" and the "specter of revolt or regime collapse", South Korea and the U.S. could negotiate from a position of strength a peaceful transition of the regime that would include real denuclearization and improvement of human rights, as well as a pragmatic "way out for the Kims."

Lee has concluded that a key point of leverage are American-led financial sanctions, since the regime deeply relies on dollars as its foreign currency, and the U.S. is uniquely positioned to use its control over the dollar-based international financial system as well as its economic might, to more effectively impose and enforce sanctions. Overall, Lee recommends:

Direct sanctions on North Korea's international trade and financial flows.
Block any trade of arms, luxury goods, and other goods or services that are a significant source of cash or material support to the regime.
Freeze the assets of Kim Jong Un or any of his top deputies, who are believed to have billions of dollars in European and Chinese banks.
Secondary sanctions: Impose sanctions on North Korea's partners, "thus presenting them with a strong economic disincentive: Either continue to do business with North Korea and be blocked out of the U.S. financial system or stop all business with North Korea and continue to have access to the U.S. financial system,"
Publicly identify and sanction all foreign companies, financial institutions, and governments assisting North Korea's nuclear and missile programs.
This crucially includes "levying hefty fines on the Chinese banks that, unwittingly or otherwise, launder money for Pyongyang and facilitate dollar transactions on behalf of North Korean entities."

As a reference point on strength and duration of sanctions, Lee remarks that it took several years for a combination of direct and secondary sanctions to bring Iran back to the bargaining table. Moreover, contrary to popular belief, sanctions on North Korea are not "maxed out"; rather, until the sanctions imposed by the U.S. in 2016, American sanctions against North Korea were much weaker than those applied to Iran, Syria, or Burma, Belarus, and Zimbabwe. The 2016 U.S. sanctions brought the enforcement against the North to a "normal" level.

Avoiding concessionary diplomacy
Lee argues that the North Korean regime has a well-established cycle of escalating tensions, followed by overtures to dialogue and deescalation. The latter bait counterparts that are always eager to resume peace talks, into prematurely softening their sanctions on the North and even sending funds and aid, just to see the North violate any agreements made, and restart the cycle. In this way, the North has extracted profitable concessions at every cycle. Furthermore, the idea of the North negotiating the surrender of their nuclear program is all but an illusion unless the regime comes to a point of near-collapse.

Information campaign
Lee has written that "applied in greater force and scale, propaganda may be a more powerful deterrent than force. Pyongyang rightfully fears the precedent of Seoul responding asymmetrically with information warfare. (...) Just imagine if Seoul and Washington vastly increased funding for radio broadcast and other information operations into North Korea, as they well should. In an Orwellian world, 'War is peace, freedom is slavery, and ignorance is strength.' In the surreal world of the DPRK, the past 62 years of de facto peace in Korea is war, a life of extreme servitude to the state is freedom, and national strength is preserved by keeping the people ignorant of the outside world." Therefore, "informing and educating the North Korean people is not only the right thing to do" but also a way to "delegitimize Kim's rule in the eyes of his people" and create "great leverage vis-à-vis Pyongyang."

United States: Continued commitment to regional stability 
Lee supports a continued commitment by the US, asserting that the "U.S. has always had in its diplomatic toolbox various useful implements like financial sanctions, measures to prevent illicit activities and weapons proliferation, freeze fuel oil delivery and unconditional aid, and human rights campaigns through the international media in concert with other civilized nations of the world, not to mention UN Resolutions".

Lee has also proposed the U.S. "hold quiet consultations with Beijing to prepare jointly for a unified Korea under Seoul’s direction, a new polity that will be free, peaceful, capitalist, pro-U.S. and pro-China".

Lee opposes the signing of a peace treaty between the U.S. and North Korea (frequently demanded by the latter) absent substantial changes in the regime. He has stated that "North Korea is not seeking peace, but rather a change in the military balance of power on the Korean peninsula", and that "real peace is won by resolve and sacrifice, while ephemeral peace is all too often concocted only by vowels and consonants". Lee maintains that the U.S. military presence in Korea has brought decades of geopolitical stability in the broader region and should remain in the peninsula regardless of the eventual signing of a peace treaty.

South Korea: Reconciliation through strength and pragmatism 
Lee advocates for a stronger lead by South Korea, reinforcing programs for resettlement of refugees, and pressing on in the global campaign for human rights.  Lee also supports a South Korean policy of exercising a "resolute mix of stoicism and principled apathy" when faced with North Korea's attempts at provocation and brinksmanship.

Lee was a strong critic of the Sunshine Policy (in force between 1998 and 2008), calling it a failed policy. He stated that the North Korean regime would not be appeased by blandishments, further, such concessions prop the regime and prolong its oppression of the people.

Reconciliation should be sought from a position of strength. South Korea should remain pragmatic, recognizing that "peace in the region has been kept for the last 50 years by the commitment on the part of the United States to the defense of South Korea". Lee also has advocated for increased missile defense capabilities by the South."

Lee has stated that "amnesia or apathy" of the new Korean generations towards their history "can be reversed through sustained education and the public ritual of remembrance", so that "the lessons of the most traumatic past must be learned and continually relearned, not only to prevent such a tragedy from repeating itself, but also to honor, as one nation, those who made our freedom possible, and to remember that freedom is certainly never free".

Assessment of North Korea

Regime and human rights
Lee characterizes the North Korean regime as "uniquely unique", for being the world's sole communist hereditary dynasty; the only literate, industrialized and urbanized peacetime economy to have suffered a famine; the most cultish totalitarian system; the most secretive, isolated country; and the largest military in terms of manpower and defense spending proportional to its population and national income. Lee has also called the regime a criminal enterprise, for activities including money laundering, human enslavement by having the world's largest prison and slave labor camps, and for nuclear extortion.

Lee further asserts that North Korea is the most systematic violator of human rights, having committed nine out of the ten crimes against humanity as specified in article 7 of the Rome Statute of the International Criminal Court.

Nuclear pursuit and denuclearization talks
Talking about the logic for the regime's nuclear pursuit, he remarked that "a nuclear North Korea is unlike a nuclear China or Russia. During the Cold War, neither Beijing nor Moscow faced an existential threat in the form of an alternate Chinese or Russian state. Pyongyang, on the other hand, has had to live with a far more prosperous and legitimate Korean state across its southern border." A nuclear capability by the North would undermine the U.S. commitment to defending the South, and "a nonnegotiable means of isolating and exercising dominance over Seoul" and as the key to ensure the long-term survival of the Kim regime.

Therefore, lee has repeatedly called negotiations on denuclearization "nuclear blackmail" by the North and believes that "short of change in the Pyongyang regime, further fits of nuclear negotiations are all but an exercise in futility", in which the Kim regime treating negotiations (including the six-party talks) as "a perpetual multilateral forum for receiving economic and political aid".

Post-collapse planning
Lee anticipates that in case of collapse, "a power vacuum in Pyongyang will require the immediate dispatch of South Korean and U.S. troops. Next will come other regional powers -- Chinese peacekeeping forces securing the northern areas, followed by the Japanese Maritime Self-Defense Force transporting people and supplies along the Korean coastlines. In the short term, a multiparty international presence north of the 38th parallel under the nominal banner of the United Nations will enforce order and provide aid."

Lee also supports a US-South Korea joint "emergency response measures such as securing the North's stockpiles of weapons of mass destruction, maintaining public safety, controlling borders, and providing humanitarian aid to displaced North Koreans", as well as long-term development similar to post-WWII reconstruction of Japan.

List of works

Books

Articles

Short essays 

 (co-authored with Joshua Stanton)

 (co-authored with Joshua Stanton)
 (co-authored with Joshua Stanton)
 (co-authored with Joshua Stanton)
 (co-authored with Zach Przystup)
 (co-authored with Joshua Stanton)
 (co-authored with Joshua Stanton)
  (co-authored with Joshua Stanton)
 (co-authored with Joshua Stanton)
 (co-authored with Joshua Stanton)
 (co-authored with Joshua Stanton)

 (co-authored with Joshua Stanton)

 (co-authored with Joshua Stanton)
 (co-authored with Joshua Stanton)

 (co-authored with Sue Terry)

Expert witness works

Congressional hearings

Judicial
 WARMBIER et al v. DEMOCRATIC PEOPLE'S REPUBLIC OF KOREA (District Of Columbia District Court, case 1:18-cv-00977)

United States v. Christopher Philip Ahn (U.S. District Court for the Central District of California, case 2:19-cv-05397-FLA-JPR) (extradition to Spain case related to the North Korean Embassy in Madrid incident)

References

Notes 
Sung-Yoon Lee's policy views on North Korea are sourced from the following works

External links 

 Video U.S.-North Korea Summit, Possible Outcomes (Heritage Foundation/C-SPAN, 2018)
 Video South Korea-Japan Issues (Heritage Foundation/C-SPAN, 2014)
 Audio North Korea's Threats Grow More Ominous (NPR Talk of the Nation, 2013)
 Video House Committee on Foreign Affairs, Hearing on "North Korea’s Criminal Activities: Financing the Regime" (C-SPAN, 2013)
 Audio Is Status Quo Destiny? China's Interests in Post-Kim Dynasty Korea (Wilson Center, 2011)
 Kim Koo Foundation official website
 Korea Foundation official website
 The Fletcher School of Law and Diplomacy

International relations scholars
The Fletcher School at Tufts University faculty
Tufts University faculty
Living people
The Fletcher School at Tufts University alumni
South Korean academics
Experts on North Korea
Year of birth missing (living people)